Long Branch is a  long 2nd order tributary to Reedy Fork in Guilford County, North Carolina.

Course
Long Branch rises on the Mears Fork divide at Hillsdale, North Carolina in Guilford County.  Long Branch then flows southeast to meet Reedy Fork in Lake Townsend.

Watershed
Long Branch drains  of area, receives about 45.6 in/year of precipitation, has a topographic wetness index of 409.99 and is about 53% forested.

References

Rivers of North Carolina
Rivers of Guilford County, North Carolina